Gurab-e Jomeh (also Romanized as Gūrāb-e Jom‘eh; also known as Gūrāb-e Balūchhā) is a village in Dasht-e Khak Rural District, in the Central District of Zarand County, Kerman Province, Iran. At the 2006 census, its population was 66, in 17 families.

References 

Populated places in Zarand County